Lipoamide is a trivial name for 6,8-dithiooctanoic amide. It is the functional form of lipoic acid, i.e the carboxyl group is attached to protein via an amine with an amide linkage. Illustrative of the biochemical role of lipoamide is in the conversion of pyruvate to acetyl lipoamide.

Lipoamide is found in a large number of plant and animal-based foods.

See also
 Lipoic acid

References

External links

Organic disulfides
Carboxamides